The National Public Complaints and Proposals Administration is the national ombudsman office of the People's Republic of China. A State Council's affiliated national bureau founded in 2000, the office is responsible for hearing public complaints and proposals against various levels of government agencies nationwide.

The office is under the leadership of the Social Work Department of the Chinese Communist Party Central Committee since March 2023.

History 
In 2023, the Administration was placed directly under the State Council, previously being subordinate to its General Office. It was also placed under the "unified leadership" of the newly-established Social Work Department of the CCP.

See also
Petitioning (China)

References

External links
 

State Council of the People's Republic of China
Complaints organizations
Ombudsman organizations